Josef Růžička (17 March 1925 – 11 April 1986) was a Czechoslovak wrestler. He was born in Prague. He won an Olympic silver medal in Greco-Roman wrestling in 1952. He died on 11 April 1986, at the age of 61.

References

1925 births
1986 deaths
Sportspeople from Prague
Czechoslovak male sport wrestlers
Olympic wrestlers of Czechoslovakia
Wrestlers at the 1948 Summer Olympics
Wrestlers at the 1952 Summer Olympics
Czech male sport wrestlers
Olympic silver medalists for Czechoslovakia
Olympic medalists in wrestling
Medalists at the 1952 Summer Olympics